Cham-e Mahavi (also Romanized as Cham-e Mahāvī and Cham-e Mohāvī, Cham Mahāvī-ye Soflá, Cham Mohāvī-ye Soflá, Chim, and Kem) is a village in Jarahi Rural District, in the Central District of Mahshahr County, Khuzestan Province, Iran. At the 2006 census, its population was 115, in 21 families.

References 

Populated places in Mahshahr County